Pierrette Venne (born 8 August 1945 in Beauharnois, Quebec) was a member of the House of Commons of Canada from 1988 to 2003. By career, she is a lawyer.

Venne was elected in the Saint-Hubert electoral district as a member of the Progressive Conservative Party in the 1988 general election. The riding had been created from a restructuring of two ridings. She was re-elected in Saint-Hubert in the 1993 general election, and was also re-elected in 1997 and 2000 when the riding was renamed Saint-Bruno—Saint-Hubert. Her term of office would cover the 34th, 35th, 36th and 37th Canadian Parliaments.

She left the Conservatives to join the Bloc Québécois party on 12 August 1991. On 7 February 2003 she was ejected from the Bloc after she made critical comments about party leader Gilles Duceppe. Venne remained in Parliament until the end of her term after which she left politics.

Electoral record

External links
 
 CBC News: "BQ expels Venne for criticizing Duceppe", 6 February 2003, retrieved 13 July 2006

1945 births
Living people
Bloc Québécois MPs
Independent MPs in the Canadian House of Commons
Members of the House of Commons of Canada from Quebec
Progressive Conservative Party of Canada MPs
Women members of the House of Commons of Canada
Women in Quebec politics
21st-century Canadian politicians
21st-century Canadian women politicians